Štěpán Jeník (born February 12, 1993 in Prague) is a Czech professional ice hockey player. He played four games for HC Slavia Praha in the Czech Extraliga during the 2010–11 Czech Extraliga season.

References

External links

1993 births
Living people
Bisons de Neuilly-sur-Marne players
Czech ice hockey defencemen
BK Havlíčkův Brod players
HC Most players
Peliitat Heinola players
HC Slavia Praha players
Ice hockey people from Prague
VHK Vsetín players
Czech expatriate ice hockey players in Finland
Czech expatriate sportspeople in France
Expatriate ice hockey players in France